Acacia steedmanii is a shrub or tree of the genus Acacia and the subgenus Phyllodineae. It is native to an area in the  Wheatbelt, Pilbara and Goldfields regions of Western Australia.

It blooms from August to September and produces yellow flowers.

There are two recognised subspecies:
 Acacia steedmanii subsp. borealis
 Acacia steedmanii subsp. steedmanii

See also
 List of Acacia species

References

steedmanii
Acacias of Western Australia
Taxa named by Joseph Maiden
Taxa named by William Blakely